Anania flavimacularis is a moth in the family Crambidae. It was described by Dan-Dan Zhang, Hou-Hun Li and Shi-Mei Song in 2002. It is found in Yunnan, China.

References

Moths described in 2002
Pyraustinae
Moths of Asia